Elizabeth Shaw may refer to:

Elizabeth Orr Shaw (1923–2014), American politician and lawyer
Elizabeth Shaw (artist) (1920–1992), Irish artist, illustrator and children's book author
Elizabeth Shaw (confectionery company)
Liz Shaw, a character from the television series Doctor Who
Elizabeth Shaw, a character played by Noomi Rapace in the film Prometheus

See also
Elizabeth Shore, aka Jane Shore, mistress of Edward IV of England

Shaw, Elizabeth